Major Pain 2 Indee Freedom: The Best of Hed P.E. is a retrospective compilation by Hed PE. It was released in 2010 on Suburban Noize Records, and is the first authorized compilation of material by the band.

Music
Major Pain 2 Indee Freedom focuses primarily on the band's recordings under Suburban Noize Records, with four tracks from earlier albums recorded for Jive Records. Jive had previously issued the compilation The Best of Hed Planet Earth without the band's involvement. The music of Major Pain 2 Indee Freedom incorporates elements of styles ranging from hip hop and reggae to punk rock, hardcore punk and heavy metal. The new song "No Rest 4 da Wicked" was recorded especially for this album, and features a chorous reminiscent of The Police. The band purchased new recording material for the song, which premiered on Noisecreep.

Reviews

Allmusic wrote "While not a perfectly well-rounded retrospective, Major Pain 2 Indee Freedom: The Best of Hed P.E. does a good job summarizing (hed) p.e.’s recordings for Suburban Noize". Kik Axe Music called the retrospective "a love letter to longtime listeners [that] just might bring some new ones into the fold as well."

Tracks

Most of the live tracks are from the limited bonus DVD that came with the album. The studio tracks are all the bonus tracks (except one, "Bucky Lasek") from New World Orphans when the album was released  standard and in three different color variations (black, white and red).

References

2010 greatest hits albums
Hed PE compilation albums